is a former Japanese football player.

Playing career
Shimada was born in Osaka Prefecture on February 9, 1965. After graduating from Osaka University of Health and Sport Sciences, he joined Matsushita Electric (later Gamba Osaka) in 1987. He became a regular player as center back from first season. In 1990, the club won the champions Emperor's Cup, which was the first major title in the club's history. He retired at the end of the 1997 season.

Coaching career
After retirement, Shimada became a coach for Gamba Osaka in 1998. He mainly managed youth team until 2010.

Club statistics

References

External links

1965 births
Living people
Osaka University of Health and Sport Sciences alumni
Association football people from Osaka Prefecture
Japanese footballers
Japan Soccer League players
J1 League players
Gamba Osaka players
Association football defenders